Reverse sneezing, also known as inspiratory paroxysmal respiration, is a clinical event that occurs in dogs. It is possibly caused by a muscle spasm at the back of the dog's mouth, more specifically where the muscle and throat meet. Other hypotheses state that it occurs when the dog's soft palate gets irritated. The irritation causes spasms in the soft palate muscle thus narrowing the trachea. Because the trachea is narrowed, the dog isn't able to inhale a full breath of air, resulting in forceful attempts to inhale through their nose. This causes the dog to experience reverse sneezing.

The clinical symptoms seem to occur more in brachycephalic dog breeds such as Chihuahuas, Boxer, English- and French bulldogs. The specific cause of reverse sneezing is unknown but there could be a link between nasal, pharyngeal or sinus irritation which increases the production of mucus. In attempt to remove this excess mucus, reverse sneezing can be observed. Another hypothesis is based on the overexcitement of the dog which might cause reverse sneezing. Reverse sneezing might also be caused by a previous diagnosis such as tracheal collapse.

During an episode of reverse sneezing, symptoms such as sudden, involuntary respiratory reflex can be noted. As a response to reverse sneezing, the air is sucked in through the nose in a series of rapid and forceful inhalations. An episode of reverse sneezing usually lasts for 30 seconds or less although it might feel longer for the owner. For reverse sneezing, there are no confirmed treatments yet to be found, but there are some commonly used remedies.

Signs and symptoms 
Reverse sneezing oftentimes occurs when the dog is asleep or immediately after a long nap. It can also be experienced following play, exercise or meals. Other dogs experience it whilst inhaling dust but the episodes of reverse sneezing typically occur randomly. The dog's size does not have a direct impact on reverse sneezing. However, smaller dogs have shown to be more susceptible to reverse sneezing. In addition, research shows that brachycephalic dogs are more prone to develop reverse sneezing than other dog breeds.

Reverse sneezing is characterized by rapid and long inhalations, extending from the head and neck. In most cases, the dog stands still during an episode. A snorting or gagging sound can be observed as a result of a dog inhaling their sneezes.

The dog undergoes reverse sneezing to expel an irritating agent. Normally, a regular sneeze helps by expelling the irritating agent in the nasal cavity. Coughing will make the irritating agent move further down in the trachea. Reverse sneezing is a way of the dog's body to expel an irritating agent slightly further down at the nasopharynx or the area near the soft palate. Some examples of possible causes of irritation that result in reverse sneezing include: allergies, nasal mites, exercise intolerance and elongated soft palate. An elongated soft palate mostly occurs in dogs of brachycephalic breeds.

A dog that experiences reverse sneezing, appears to be normal after an episode of reverse sneezing. Most dogs who are prone to developing the condition will experience reverse sneezing repeatedly throughout their lives. The reverse sneezing might be distressing for the animal but it is not known to be harmful.

Reverse sneezing as a symptom of other conditions 
It is common for reverse sneezing to be a symptom of another condition or diagnosis, meaning reverse sneezing might lead to the discovery of an underlying condition.  A dog which was diagnosed with nasal eucoleosis was experiencing symptoms of reverse sneezing amongst other clinical symptoms.

Treatment 
A commonly used remedy for reverse sneezing is to pinch in the dog's nose and scratch its neck or back and rub its sides. Other techniques which can be applied include gently blowing in the dog's face to make the dog swallow or gently opening the dog's mouth and pressing down on the tongue. This treatment can alleviate the spasm and make the episode of reverse sneezing pass quicker.

In most cases, the reverse sneezing will stop when the dog has swallowed a couple of times.

The treatment of reverse sneezing does not specifically require medication. Studies have proven that medication such as antihistamines and steroids may be effective if the reverse sneezing is serious, chronic or allergy-related. In case of chronic episodes or other respiratory issues, a clinical diagnosis made by a veterinarian is recommended. In severe cases of reverse sneezing, rhinoscopy can be used to determine possible causes for the reverse sneezing.

Prognosis 
Although a great deal of research has been done in order to determine the clinical cause of reverse sneezing, any specific origin for reverse sneezing has yet been found.

References

External links
Paroxysmal respiration
Reverse Sneezing In Dogs: Is It Normal? from PetMD.com

Dog health
Articles containing video clips